Ankara Demirspor is a Turkish professional football club based in Ankara. They compete in the TFF Second League. They were one of the Super League's founding members in 1959. By winning the former Turkish Football Championship in 1947, they became Turkish champions for the first and only time. They played 13 seasons in the Super League and relegated to the Second League in 1971 and never returned to the top division.

Ankara Demirspor is one of the 38 Demirspor clubs in Turkey that are founded by the employees of the Turkish Railways (TCDD), similar to the Lokomotiv sports clubs of Eastern Europe. Most Demirspor clubs have jersey colours identical to Ankara Demirspor, and bear the TCDD symbol on their logo. Ankara Demirspor and Adana Demirspor are the only  Demirspor club that compete in the Turkish Professional Football League System, and Ankara Demirspor is the only one that is still affiliated with TCDD.

History
The club was founded on March 16, 1930. Today, the colours of the club are navy blue, blue, and white. The former colours of the team were red and green.

League Participations
 Turkish Super League: 1958–71
 TFF First League: 1971–83, 1995–98
 TFF Second League: 1984–95, 1998–06, 2015–16, 2018-
 TFF Third League: 2006–15, 2016–18
 Turkish Regional Amateur League: 1983–84

Honours
 Turkish Football Championship
 Winners (1): 1947
 National Division
 Runners-up (1): 1939
 Prime Minister's Cup
 Runners-up (1): 1947
 Ankara Football League
 Winners (5): 1938–39, 1942–43, 1946–47, 1947–48, 1958–59
 Runners-up (3): 1948–49, 1956–57, 1957–58

Current squad

Out on loan

References

External links
Official website
Ankara Demirspor on TFF.org

Football clubs in Ankara
1930 establishments in Turkey
Association football clubs established in 1930
Railway association football teams
Süper Lig clubs